epi-Isozizaene synthase (EC 4.2.3.37, SCO5222 protein) is an enzyme with systematic name (2E,6E)-farnesyl-diphosphate diphosphate-lyase ((+)-epi-isozizaene-forming). This enzyme catalyses the following chemical reaction

 (2E,6E)-farnesyl diphosphate  (+)-epi-isozizaene + diphosphate

This enzyme requires Mg2+ for activity.

References

External links 
 

EC 4.2.3